Armen Mkrtchyan (born 6 October 1973) is an Armenian freestyle wrestler. He is an Olympic silver medalist, World Championships medalist, and European Champion. In addition, he was also awarded the Master of Sport of the USSR, International Class title in 1991 and the Honored Master of Sports of Armenia title in 1996.

Biography
Mkrtchyan began his wrestling career under the guidance of Razmik Karapetyan and, in 1992 and for the rest of his career, under Yuri Babayan and Grant Yenokyan. Armen was a member of the USSR national wrestling team as a junior. In 1990, he won the Junior World Wrestling Championship gold medal at the age of 18.

After the collapse of the USSR in 1991, he represented Armenia at international competitions. He won the 1992 Espoir European Championships and 1993 Espoir World Championships. In 1994, Armen won a gold medal at the European Wrestling Championships in Rome. He became the first European Wrestling Champion of the independent Republic of Armenia in freestyle wrestling. Mkrtchyan won a bronze medal at the 1995 World Wrestling Championships in Atlanta, the first medal won by a freestyle wrestler of Armenia. Because Mkrtchyan had ranked in the top six wrestlers of his division, he received automatic qualification to return to Atlanta in a year's time to compete at the 1996 Summer Olympics.

At the 1996 Olympic Games in Atlanta, Mkrtchyan reached the finals, where he faced off against the division reigning Olympic Champion Kim Il of North Korea. Mkrtchyan and Kim both put up a bitter struggle in a back and forth match. In the end, Mkrtchyan lost by one point, 4–5. This had been the closest to defeat Kim had come to in five years. Mkrtchyan became the first ever Olympic silver medalist from Armenia.

In 1997, Mkrtchyan moved up to a heavier weight class, moving from paperweight (48 kg) to flyweight (54 kg). He was unable to qualify for the 2000 Summer Olympics. After winning a bronze medal at the 2001 European Wrestling Championships, Mkrtchyan retired.

References

 Mkrtchyan vs Kim, 1996 Olympics video at YouTube.com

External links
 

1973 births
Living people
People from Vedi
Armenian male sport wrestlers
Olympic wrestlers of Armenia
Wrestlers at the 1996 Summer Olympics
Olympic silver medalists for Armenia
Olympic medalists in wrestling
Medalists at the 1996 Summer Olympics
World Wrestling Championships medalists
European Wrestling Championships medalists